Santas Anonymous is an annual campaign 'devoted to bettering the lives of children in our community by delivering the "spirit" of Christmas to less fortunate children' in Edmonton, Alberta, Canada.  It is sponsored by Edmonton's 630 CHED radio station in coordination with the Christmas Bureau of Edmonton.

Santas Anonymous began in 1955 when CHED radio general manager Jerry Forbes learned there were many children in Edmonton "who simply went without a gift during the Christmas season."  When Forbes was asked why he started Santas Anonymous, he said

From a few thousand children in 1955, the charity has grown to over 25,000 children.  The program owes its success to hundreds of volunteers who wrap and deliver toys, and the generosity of thousands of Edmontonians who drop new, unwrapped toys off at collection sites located throughout the Edmonton area.

The Edmonton based Santas Anonymous should not be confused with the student run campaign Father Mercredi Santas (Also known as Santas Anonymous), which is run by students in Fort McMurray, Alberta.

References

External links
 Santas Anonymous web site
 Father Mercredi Santas web site

Organizations based in Edmonton